Naulakha (meaning "worth 9 lakh rupees" in Hindi language) may refer to:

Naulakha, Punjab, a historical village of Fatehgarh Sahib District, Punjab, India
Naulakha Pavilion, a century-arched chamber at Lahore Fort, Pakistan built for Shah Jahan in 1633
Naulakha Palace, a ruined 17th-century palace in Gondal, India
Naulakha Mandir, Indian Hindu temples near Deoghar and Buxar
Naulakha (Rudyard Kipling House) a house in Dummerston, Vermont, built for Rudyard Kipling in 1893
Naulakha Redux, an album of songs of Rudyard Kipling works, recorded in 1997 by Roberts and Barrand
Naulakha (TV series), a 2018–2019 Pakistani drama serial

Naulahka
The Naulahka: A Story of West and East, a novel by Wolcott Balestier and Rudyard Kipling published in 1892
The Naulahka (film), a 1918 film adaptation of the novel